Promalactis ramispinea is a moth of the family Oecophoridae. It is found in Fujian, Guangdong, Hunan and Jiangxi provinces of China.

Description 
The wingspan is about 10–12 mm. The ground colour of the forewings is orange yellow. The costal margin with an inverted triangular black blotch. The hindwings and cilia are dark grey.

Etymology
The specific name is derived from the Latin prefix rami- (meaning branch) and Latin spineus (meaning spine-like) and refers to the strong spines in the distal quarter of the cornutus.

References

External links 

Moths described in 2013
Oecophorinae
Insects of China